Leonard Francis Tremeer (1 August 1874 – 21 October 1951), known as Jimmy Tremeer, was an Olympic bronze medallist in the men's 400 metres hurdles at the 1908 Summer Olympics.  He competed on the Great Britain and Ireland team.

Tremeer had no competition in the first round, winning in a walkover.  For the second round, he faced teammate G. Burton, who did not finish the race.  In the final, Tremeer had to contend against two Americans who had taken turns setting new Olympic records in the first two rounds of the event.  Halfway through the race, it became evident that Tremeer had no chance.  He finished third in 57.0 seconds, a time that was still faster than anyone had run the race before the London Olympics.

References

External links
 Sports Reference

1874 births
1951 deaths
British male hurdlers
Olympic athletes of Great Britain
Athletes (track and field) at the 1908 Summer Olympics
Olympic bronze medallists for Great Britain
Medalists at the 1908 Summer Olympics
Olympic bronze medalists in athletics (track and field)